LOP may refer to:

 Landscape of practice in social science
 Language oriented programming
 C2.LOP, Windows malware
 Line of position in geometry and navigation
 Local operational picture
 Lombok International Airport (IATA code)
 Long Ping station (Hong Kong MTR station code)

See also
 Lop (disambiguation)